The Muggins Mountain Wilderness is a  wilderness area in the U.S. state of Arizona. Three deeply cut washes drain the southwest border of the wilderness, Twin Tanks Wash, Muggins Wash, and Morgan Wash. Muggins Wash is the access point to the wilderness, by way of County 7th Street.

The ruggedness of the Muggins Mountain Wilderness is ideal for activities such as day hiking, backpacking, rock climbing, sightseeing, photography, and studying nature, native plants, or wildlife.

The nearest communities are Dome, Ligurta, or Wellton in the Dome or Mohawk Valleys; the Fortuna Foothills suburb of Yuma is located west over the Gila Mountains (Yuma County).

See also
 Muggins Mountains – (includes a 3-mountain range area description)
 Muggins Mountain Wilderness flora
 List of LCRV Wilderness Areas (Colorado River)
 List of Arizona Wilderness Areas

References

External links
 BLM Muggins Mountain Wilderness site
 Wilderness Connect: "Muggins Mountain Wilderness" site
 Muggins Mountain Wilderness site at the Public Lands Interpretive Association:  Muggins Mountains map and region: 
Southwestern Arizona Region:
 Southern Arizona: Wilderness.net

Wilderness areas within the Lower Colorado River Valley
Protected areas of the Sonoran Desert
Wilderness areas of Arizona
Protected areas of Yuma County, Arizona
Bureau of Land Management areas in Arizona
Protected areas established in 1990
1990 establishments in Arizona